William Tecumseh Sherman, also known as the Sherman Memorial or Sherman Monument, is a sculpture group honoring William Tecumseh Sherman, created by Augustus Saint-Gaudens and located at Grand Army Plaza in Manhattan, New York. Cast in 1902 and dedicated on May 30, 1903, the gilded-bronze monument consists of an equestrian statue of Sherman and an accompanying statue, Victory, an allegorical female figure of the Greek goddess Nike. The statues are set on a Stony Creek granite pedestal designed by the architect Charles Follen McKim.

History

1913 plaza design and statue relocation
The newspaper publisher Joseph Pulitzer died in 1911 having bequeathed $50,000 for the creation of a memorial fountain to be "like those in the Place de la Concorde, Paris France". In December 1912, the executors of Pulitzer's estate announced that New York City had approved the fountain's proposed location, in the plaza between 58th Street and 60th Street, just west of Fifth Avenue, the same plaza where the equestrian Sherman Monument stood since 1903. The executors invited five architecture firms to participate in a competition to determine the fountain's design, and to provide designs for a "good architectural treatment of the whole plaza". In January 1913, the five schemes were exhibited at the New York Public Library, including the winning scheme, designed by Carrère and Hastings. Construction of the new plaza began in 1915, and by November one newspaper reported: "The Pulitzer Fountain...is now finished and bubbling with the purest Croton water," noting that work on the northern portion of the plaza was delayed by subway construction.

1974 landmarks designation
On May 30, 1974, the Landmarks Preservation Commission held a public hearing to consider designation of the Grand Army Plaza, including the Sherman Monument, as a Scenic Landmark. The measure was approved on July 23, 1974.

Restoration
On March 26, 1985, the Central Park Conservancy and the architecture firm of Buttrick White & Burtis presented plans to the Landmarks Preservation Commission for a full restoration of the plaza, including the Sherman Monument.  The work was completed in June 1990, including a re-gilding of the statue, and the replacement of a palm frond and a sword that had been removed previously.
The Grand Army Plaza was renewed again in 2013, including a re-gilding of the statue of William Tecumseh Sherman.

Critiques
According to the report prepared by the Landmarks Commission for its 1974 designation, many consider the Sherman Monument to be Saint-Gaudens’ finest work. Not everyone agreed; according to Frank Weitenkampf, sculptor John Quincy Adams Ward was less than enthusiastic about the equestrian composition: "Saint-Gaudens was a timid rider and it showed in this work.... if the horse should stumble the general would inevitably be thrown over his head."

Use on coinage

The obverse of Saint-Gaudens' 1907 United States Saint-Gaudens double eagle coin, portraying Liberty, is based on his sculpture of Victory.

Gallery

References

External links
 

1902 establishments in New York City
1902 sculptures
59th Street (Manhattan)
Saint-Gaudens
Allegorical sculptures in New York City
Bronze sculptures in New York City
Equestrian statues in New York City
Monuments and memorials in Manhattan
Outdoor sculptures in Manhattan
Sculptures by Augustus Saint-Gaudens
Sculptures in Central Park
Sculptures of Greek goddesses
Victory